In traditional Chinese medicine and Chinese culture, yuán qì (元氣) is an innate or prenatal qi. This inborn qi is differentiated from acquired qi that a person may develop over their lifetime.

Porkert describes the concept as "the metaphorical designation of the inborn constitution, the vital potential that is gradually used up in the course of life. It may be conserved but never replenished."

The term has been used since at least the Han Dynasty, where it is found in the chapter 'Lu Li Zhi Shang/律历志上' of the History Book, 'Han Shu.'

Usage in Japanese

In modern times it has come to be used in a colloquial manner in Japanese (where it is pronounced genki (元気)) to mean "healthy" or "energetic", a usage that has more recently been borrowed back into Chinese. This colloquial usage of the term forms the basis of a variety of Japanese expressions, including the standard casual greeting, genki desu ka (元気ですか), which translates to "are you well?". As the equivalent of "How are you doing?" in English, it is a rhetorical question and generally answered in the affirmative.

See also
Jing
Neijia
Glossary of alternative medicine

References

Porkert, The Theoretical Foundations of Chinese Medicine  MIT Press (1974) 

Traditional Chinese medicine
Chinese words and phrases